Julie Michelle Palais (born September 2, 1956 in Massachusetts) is an American polar glaciologist who has made significant contributions to climate change research studying volcanic fallout in ice cores from both Greenland and Antarctica. For many years, starting in 1990, she played a pivotal role working at the National Science Foundation (NSF) as Program Director of the Antarctic Glaciology Program in the Division of Polar Programs, including many trips to both North and South Polar regions. Both the Palais Glacier and Palais Bluff in Antarctica were named in her honor and she has received many further recognitions for her distinguished career.

Early life and education 
Palais attended Newton North High School in Massachusetts, graduating in 1974. In 1978, she received her Bachelor of Arts (BA) cum laude in Geology/Earth Science from the University of New Hampshire. She attended Ohio State University between 1978 and 1985, where she earned both a Master of Science (MS) and a Doctor of Philosophy (PhD) in Geological and Earth Sciences/Geosciences. Her graduate research focused on the study of volcanic fallout in snow and polar ice cores from both Greenland and in samples from the Byrd ice core and from shallow ice cores near Mt. Erebus on Ross Island in Antarctica.

Career and impact 
For over 26 years Palais directed polar glaciology research as Program Director for the Division of Polar Programs Antarctic Glaciology Program at NSF.
In an effort to understand the history and dynamics of the Antarctic and Greenland ice sheets, NSF research programs focus on various glaciology aspects including the use of ice cores as global paleoclimate indicators. Palais made more than 27 trips to Antarctica and 3 to Greenland.

Palais is a member of numerous professional societies including the American Geophysical Union, the International Glaciological Society, the American Polar Society, the Explorers Club and the Animals and Society Institute.

Encore career 
After her retirement from the National Science Foundation in 2016 she began a new career in the field of animal welfare. After completing a Post Graduate Certificate in 2017 from the University of Edinburgh (Royal Dick School of Veterinary Medicine) in International Animal Welfare, Ethics and Law (IAWEL) she did a Master of Science degree in Anthrozoology (Human-Animal Studies), at Canisius College in Buffalo, N.Y., graduating in the Spring of 2019. During her graduate degree in Anthrozoology she interned at the Animal Welfare Institute (AWI) in Washington, D.C. and she began looking at the data being collected by the FBI (since 2016) on animal cruelty in the U.S.

After graduating she continued her work looking at the animal cruelty data in the National Incident-Based Reporting System (NIBRS) of the FBI. The analyses included not only state to state differences in the numbers of incidents reported but also the demographics of offenders, and the other criminal offenses co-occurring along with the incidents of animal cruelty. In addition, she noted the location, time of day and monthly variations of incidents of animal cruelty. She published her findings in four magazine articles in 2020, including an article in Public Management (International City/County Management Association); an article in Animal Care & Control Today (National Animal Care & Control Association), an article in Sheriff & Deputy Magazine (National Sheriff's Association) and one in Police Chief Magazine (International Association of Chief's of Police). Palais continues to do scholarly research on publishing a paper in the journal Social Sciences on the trends in animal cruelty from law enforcement agencies and how that relates to the potential for other crimes.

In August 2021, Palais (under her pen name Julu) published (Vajra Publications, Kathmandu, Nepal) the bilingual (English-Nepali) children’s book, “Sathi: The Street Dog from Kathmandu, Nepal”.

Awards and honors 
Palais Glacier and Palais Bluff are two features in Antarctica named in her honor by the Advisory Committee on Antarctic Names  (US-ACAN), Palais Glacier in 1995,
 and Palais Bluff in 2000.

In 2007, the Explorers Club named her co-recipient of the Lowell Thomas Award for her contributions to breakthroughs in glaciology and climate science.

In 2017, the International Glaciological Society awarded Palais the Richardson Medal for 'For insightful and steadfast service to the U.S. and international glaciological and ice core science communities by enabling discoveries that have impacted the course of climate science and enlightened understanding of the important role of glaciology and the polar regions in global climate change'.

In 2019, the University of New Hampshire (UNH) awarded Palais an honorary degree at its May 18 Commencement ceremony: "...for her contributions to climate change research, studying volcanic fallout in ice cores from both Greenland and Antarctica. She served as program director of the Antarctic glaciology program at the NSF’s Division of Polar Programs making many trips to Antarctica and Greenland to understand the history and dynamics of the Antarctic and Greenland ice sheets. ..." On September 27[7], the College of Engineering and Physical Science at UNH further honored Palais by naming her as its 2019 recipient of the Distinguished Alumni Award in recognition of her outstanding contributions to society. In presenting the award Dean Zercher said that “Julie’s service at NSF positioned her as a leader of the glaciology scientific community,  Her impact on the science and on the profession has been impressive...."  In reply Julie remarked that the part of her career of which she was the most proud was her role in the development of the U.S. ice core community that analyzes ice cores for the evidence of climate change. Early in her career, there were in the US few labs and a lack of groups that could properly collect, analyze and sample ice cores. As program manager of the Glaciology program at NSF, she was responsible for helping build the infrastructure and personnel in the United States, and it is now the U.S. science community at the top when it comes to the ability to plan and execute cutting-edge ice coring programs and contribute to the important dialogue about how climate is changing. Then, in October The Byrd Polar and Climate Research Center announced that "Dr. Palais would receive the 2019 Goldthwait Polar Medal in recognition of her distinguished record of scholarship and service polar science. She is among the pioneers of ice core science and, particularly, in studies of the geochemical signatures of volcanic deposition and other processes within the ice record. Despite her success as a scientist, she left academia to serve for at the National Science Foundation (NSF), guiding the Antarctic Glaciology program through a critical time of expansion. In her role at NSF she also helped launch the successful careers of many young polar scientists and actively increased the inclusion of women and other underrepresented groups in Antarctic research."

References

External links 
 
 West Antarctic Ice Sheet Divide Ice Core Photo Gallery

1956 births
Living people
American glaciologists
American women geologists
American Antarctic scientists
Marie Byrd Land explorers and scientists
Newton North High School alumni
Ohio State University alumni
University of New Hampshire alumni
Women Antarctic scientists
Women glaciologists
21st-century American women